The Old Left was the pre-1960s far-left in the Western world, the earlier leftist or Marxist movements that had often taken a more vanguardist approach to social justice and focused mostly on labor unionization and questions of social class in the West. Generally, the Old Left, unlike the New, focused more on economic issues than cultural ones.

Social policy 
Unlike the New Left, the Old Left puts less emphasis on social issues such as abortion, drugs, feminism, gay rights, gender roles, immigration and abolition of the capital punishment. Since the mid-1970s with the advent of revisionist movements such as Eurocommunism (and earlier in the Anglosphere, the New Left), some parties on the far left in the West have begun to adopt homosexual rights from the New Left as part of their platform while parties in the East such as the Communist Party of Greece and the Communist Party of the Russian Federation have rejected this move and continue to focus exclusively on working class as the Old Left. The party voted against the Civil Partnerships Bill proposed by Syriza, responding: "With the formation of a socialist-communist society, a new type of partnership will undoubtedly be formed—a relatively stable heterosexual relationship and reproduction".

Militant was a Trotskyist entryist group in the British Labour Party, based around the Militant newspaper launched in 1964. According to Michael Crick, its politics were influenced by Karl Marx, Friedrich Engels, Vladimir Lenin and Leon Trotsky and "virtually nobody else". Militant has been cited as an example of left-wing opposition to feminism and gay rights initiatives within the labor movement in the early 1980s, specifically within the context of reaction to the financial support given to gay rights groups by the Greater London Council under the leadership of Ken Livingstone. While Militant was present in Labour Party women's sections, claiming forty delegates attended the Labour Party women's conference in 1981, it opposed feminism which declared that men were the enemy, or the cause of women's oppression.

Immigration
The Old Left sometimes took a stance hostile to immigration, promoting policies that would preserve the ethnic homogeneity of the country. Australian Prime Minister John Curtin, who was part of the Australian Labor Party, reinforced the White Australia Policy and said the following in his defense: "This country shall remain forever the home of the descendants of those people who came here in peace in order to establish in the South Seas an outpost of the British race." Arthur Calwell, another Old Leftist who led the Australian Labor Party in the 1960s, strongly defended the White Australia Policy and said the following: "I am proud of my white skin, just as a Chinese is proud of his yellow skin, a Japanese of his brown skin, and the Indians of their various hues from black to coffee-coloured. Anybody who is not proud of his race is not a man at all. And any man who tries to stigmatize the Australian community as racist because they want to preserve this country for the white race is doing our nation great harm ... I reject, in conscience, the idea that Australia should or ever can become a multi-racial society and survive." Left-wing Labor members perceived unrestricted immigration as a ploy by owners to drive down wages, resulting in the leadership of labor unions often being skeptical of expanded immigration.

As late as 2015, Bernie Sanders criticized open borders a "Koch brothers proposal", although he later switched to the more New Left position welcoming to immigration.

Homosexuality
Communist leaders and intellectuals took many different positions on LGBT rights issues. Marx and Engels wrote little on the subject; Marx in particular commented rarely on sexuality in general. Writing for Political Affairs, Norman Markowitz writes: "Here, to be frank, one finds from Marx a refusal to entertain the subject, and from Engels open hostility to the individuals involved". This is because in private Engels criticized male homosexuality and related it to ancient Greek pederasty, saying that "[the ancient Greeks] fell into the abominable practice of sodomy [, meaning 'boy love" or pederasty] and degraded alike their gods and themselves with the myth of Ganymede". Engels also said that the pro-pederast movement "cannot fail to triumph.  [war on the cunts, peace to the arse-holes] will now be the slogan".

The Encyclopedia of Homosexuality is unequivocal on Marx and Engels view of homosexuality, stating in volume 2: "There can be little doubt that, as far as they thought of the matter at all, Marx and Engels were personally homo-phobic, as shown by an acerbic 1869 exchange of letter on Jean-Baptiste von Schweitzer, a German socialist rival. Schweitzer had been arrested in a park on a morals charge and not only did Marx and Engels refuse to join a committee defending him, they resorted to the cheapest form of bathroom humor in their private comments about the affair".

In 1933, Joseph Stalin added Article 121 to the entire Soviet Union criminal code, which made male homosexuality a crime punishable by up to five years in prison with hard labor. The precise reason for Article 121 is in some dispute among historians. The few official government statements made about the law tended to confuse homosexuality with pedophilia and was tied up with a belief that homosexuality was only practiced among fascists or the aristocracy. The law remained intact until after the dissolution of the Soviet Union and was repealed in 1993. Gay men were sometimes denied membership or expelled from Communist parties across the globe during the 20th century as most Communist parties followed the social precedents set by the Soviet Union.

The West was less beholden to Soviet ideas. Notable Western gay members of Communist parties included Mark Ashton, founder of Lesbians and Gays Support the Miners and LGBT rights advocate, a member of the Communist Party of Great Britain; and Harry Hay, a gay rights activist, labor advocate, Native American civil rights campaigner, Mattachine Society founder, co-founder of Los Angeles Gay Liberation Front, and a member of the Communist Party USA.

The Party of Socialists of the Republic of Moldova is a party which strongly opposes LGBT rights in Moldova and works with nationalist, right-wing and religious movements to counter the "promotion of vice spread with the help of the US in Moldova". The Communist Party of the Russian Federation supported an anti-gay law in 2013.

Transformation into the New Left 
The New Left arose first among dissenting intellectuals and campus groups in the United Kingdom and later alongside campuses in the United States and in the Western bloc.

The German critical theorist Herbert Marcuse is referred to as the "Father of the New Left". Marcuse rejected the theory of class struggle and the Marxist concern with labor. According to Leszek Kołakowski, Marcuse argued that since "all questions of material existence have been solved, moral commands and prohibitions are no longer relevant". He regarded the realization of man's erotic nature as the true liberation of humanity, which inspired the utopias of Jerry Rubin and others.

Between 1943 and 1950, Marcuse worked in U.S. government service for the Office of Strategic Services (predecessor of the Central Intelligence Agency) and criticized the ideology of the Communist Party of the Soviet Union in the book Soviet Marxism: A Critical Analysis (1958). After his studies, in the 1960s and the 1970s he became known as the pre-eminent theorist of the New Left and the student movements of West Germany, France and the United States.

Parties that subscribe to the Old Left 

Communist Party of Greece (since 1918)
Portuguese Communist Party (since 1921)
Communist Party (Italy) (since 2009)
Communist Party of the Russian Federation (since 1993)
Communist Party of Ukraine (since 1993)
Communist Party of Belarus (since 1996)
People's Party of Kazakhstan (since 2004)
Communist Party of South Ossetia (since 1993)
Party of Communists of Kyrgyzstan (since 1992)
Communist Party of Tajikistan (since 1918)
Party of Socialists of the Republic of Moldova (since 1997)
Polish Communist Party (2002)
Party of the Bulgarian Communists (since 1999)
Hungarian Workers' Party (since 1989)
Communist Party of Bohemia and Moravia (since 1990)
Communist Party of Albania (1991)
Communitarian Party of Romania (since 2010)
Workers Party of Britain (since 2019) 
Communist Party of Britain
Communist Party (Sweden)
Communist Party of Great Britain (Marxist–Leninist)
Communists of Russia (since 2009)

See also 
 Left-wing politics
 Left-wing populism
 New Left
 Old Right (disambiguation)
 Paleoism (disambiguation)

References 

Communism
Far-left politics
Political ideologies
Socialism